Santa with Muscles is a 1996 American Christmas comedy film starring Hulk Hogan and directed by John Murlowski. It was released for two weeks in cinemas.

Plot
Blake Thorn (Hulk Hogan) is a conceited self-made millionaire who sells bodybuilding supplements and equipment that have his picture on them. One day, while recklessly playing paintball, he is targeted by police. He is chased to a shopping mall, where he hides by putting on a Santa costume. He slides down a garbage chute to escape the police and bangs his head, resulting in amnesia. Mistaken by Lenny (Don Stark) as the mall Santa, Blake begins to think he really is Santa Claus. Meanwhile, the evil scientist Ebner Frost (Ed Begley Jr.) tries to take over an orphanage in order to gain access to the magical crystals underneath it and dispatches his henchmen to destroy it. However, Blake after discovering that being Santa has made him a better person and that Frost wants to destroy the very same orphanage he grew up in, manages to rescue the children. Frost and his henchmen are arrested, but the orphanage is destroyed due to the overload of the crystals. Blake than volunteers the Ebner Frost's evil compound to be the new orphanage. Thanks to the new orphanage and Blake we see there are more orphans than ever in this town as the movie ends.

Cast

 Hulk Hogan as Blake Thorn
 Don Stark as Lenny
 Robin Curtis as Leslie
 Garrett Morris as Clayton
 Aria Curzon as Elizabeth
 Adam Wylie as Taylor
 Mila Kunis as Sarah
 Clint Howard as Hinkley
 Steve Valentine as Dr. Blight
 Ed Begley Jr. as Ebner Frost
 William Newman as Chas
 Ed Leslie as Sumo Lab Assistant
 Brenda Song as Susan
 Pete Antico as Nose Ring

Reception

Box office
The film was released on 8 November 1996, the film garnered $120,932 in box office receipts during its opening weekend and grossed a total of $220,198 during its two-week run.

Critical response
Film critic Emanuel Levy gave the film a score of 2 out of 5. Joe Leydon in Variety described Santa with Muscles as a "weakling of a comedy" and thought that Hogan's performance was lacking the charisma of his previous work such as Suburban Commando. Leydon panned the direction in particular, stating: "Working from an irredeemably bland screenplay, John Murlowski directs with all the enthusiasm of someone going through the motions to pay off a debt." Chris Hicks, writing for the Deseret News, stated that films such as Santa with Muscles make films like Jingle All The Way look better, and said that Hulk Hogan "makes Arnold Schwarzenegger seem like Laurence Olivier". MaryAnn Johanson of Flick Filosopher called it "a deeply awful comedy" and "Believe me, it’s even dumber than it sounds."

Legacy
Reception for Santa with Muscles has continued to be negative. As of December 2011 it was listed at number 62 on IMDB's bottom 100 movies. It was listed as number 43 out of 50 worst children's films by Total Film, and was included in Virgin Media's list of worst Christmas movies. The film was also included on Atlantic City Weekly'''s list of worst holiday films, ranking third behind Santa Claus Conquers the Martians and the Star Wars Holiday Special. Due to Hogan's starring role, the film has been featured on the website Wrestlecrap, which acts as a "Hall of Shame" for the worst gimmicks and storylines in pro wrestling history. When Golden Globe nominee Mila Kunis, who made her film debut, was asked about the film in 2011 by GQ magazine, she said, "I was too young to fully understand the importance of working with Hulk Hogan. I just thought he was this huge man", while comparing the film to American Psycho 2 in which she co-starred with William Shatner. In 2021, Santa with Muscles was featured on the YouTube channel RedLetterMedia as part of their series, Best of the Worst.''

See also
 List of Christmas films
 Santa Claus in film

References

External links 
 
 
 
 Santa with Muscles on Rotten Tomatoes

1996 films
1996 comedy films
1990s children's comedy films
1990s Christmas comedy films
American children's comedy films
American Christmas comedy films
Films about orphans
Films directed by John Murlowski
Films set in California
Mad scientist films
Santa Claus in film
Sonar Entertainment films
1990s English-language films
1990s American films